Schuld & Stamer are a Canadian blues duo made up of guitarist Andreas Schuld and vocalist Hans Stamer. In 1998 their debut album No Special Rider was nominated for the Juno award. Schuld & Stamer's records often achieve critical acclaim and feature notable guests like Long John Baldry and Bill Bourne.

Discography 

Albums

References 

1998 establishments in British Columbia
Canadian blues musical groups
Canadian musical duos
Musical groups established in 1998